Lunch meats—also known as cold cuts, luncheon meats, cooked meats, sliced meats, cold meats, sandwich meats, and deli meats—are precooked or cured meats that are sliced and served cold or hot. They are typically served in sandwiches or on a tray. They can be purchased pre-sliced, usually in vacuum packs, or they can be  sliced to order.

Types 

 Bresaola
 Chicken breast
 Chicken loaf (also known as chicken roll)
 Corned beef
 Cotechino
 Dutch loaf
 Ham
 Baked
 Boiled
 Chipped chopped
 Cooked
 Éisleker
 Jamón: serrano or ibérico
 Prosciutto
 Smoked
 Head cheese
 Salceson
 Meatloaf
 Ham and cheese loaf
 Olive loaf
 Pepper loaf
 Pimento loaf
 Spiced luncheon loaf
 Veal loaf
 Mortadella
 Pork roll
 Roast beef
 Roast lamb
 Roast pork
 Sausages
 Bierwurst or beerwurst
 Blood tongue (Zungenwurst)
 Bologna, Polony
 Lebanon
 Braunschweiger
 Brühwurst
 Mettwurst
 Chorizo
 Devon
 Extrawurst
 Gelbwurst
 Jagdwurst
 Krakowska (Kraków-style pork sausage)
 Kabanos
 Myśliwska
 Liverwurst
 Prasky
 Morcilla
 Salami
 Alpino
 Capicola
 Finocchiona
 Italian-style
 Jewish-style
 Pepperoni
 Soppressata
 Salchichón
 Saucisson sec (dry, maturing, salty, savoury-tasting French salami)
 Sausagemeat stuffing
 Summer sausage
 Teewurst
 Smoked meat
 Montreal-style smoked meat
 Pastrami
 Tongue
 Turkey breast
 Spam and Treet

Health 
Most pre-sliced lunch meats are higher in fat, nitrates, and sodium than those that are sliced to order, as a larger exposed surface requires stronger preservatives. As a result, processed meats may significantly contribute to incidence of heart disease and diabetes, even more so than red meat.

A prospective study following 448,568 people across Europe, showed a positive association between processed meat consumption and mortality caused by cardiovascular disease and cancer. Similarly, a prospective study in the US following half a million people flagged a similar association between death and increased processed meat consumption. The World Cancer Research Fund International guidelines on cancer prevention recommend avoiding all processed meats.

Safety 
In 2011, the US Centers for Disease Control and Prevention advises that those over age 50 reheat lunch meats to "steaming hot"  and use them within four days.

See also 

Smallgoods
Delicatessen
Charcuterie
List of dried foods
List of sandwiches
Dagwood sandwich

References

External links 

 
Dried meat
Meat
Sandwiches
World cuisine
Lunch
Types of food
Sliced foods